Cold Vengeance is a thriller novel by Douglas Preston and Lincoln Child. It was released on August 2, 2011 by Grand Central Publishing. This is the eleventh installment in the Special Agent Pendergast series and also the second novel in the Helen trilogy. The preceding novel is Fever Dream.

Plot
The conspiracy that murdered his wife is no more, but Pendergast will not rest until every last person involved is brought to justice. Chasing the final conspirator across the moors of Scotland, Pendergast stumbles into a far greater danger than he ever knew existed: the Covenant ("Der Bund" in German), a network of Nazis and Nazi sympathisers that have retreated from public view to influence events on a global scale.

Reception

—Review by Publishers Weekly

References

External links
 Cold Vengeance (Special Agent Pendergast) Hardcover
 COLD VENGEANCE by Douglas Preston and Lincoln Child Video

American thriller novels
Novels by Douglas Preston
Novels by Lincoln Child
Collaborative novels
Sequel novels
2011 American novels
Grand Central Publishing books